Rijban is a settlement of Nafusa Mountains in Libya.

References 

Sahara
Baladiyat of Libya